Andréia (or Andreia) is a Portuguese feminine given name. Notable people named Andréia or Andreia include:

People 
 Andreia Aparecida Hessel (born 1984), Brazilian marathon runner
 Andreia Bandeira (born 1987), Brazilian amateur boxer
 Andréia de Olicar (1976-2020), Brazilian singer and composer
 Andréia dos Santos (born 1977), Brazilian women's football player
 Andreia Faria (born 2000), Portuguese footballer
 Andréia Horta (born 1983), Brazilian actress
 Andreia Jacinto (born 2002), Portuguese footballer
 Andréia Laurence (born 1983), Brazilian volleyball player
 Andreia Marras (born 1971), Brazilian volleyball player
 Andreia Norton (born 1996), Portuguese footballer
 Andréia Rosa de Andrade (born 1984), Brazilian football defender
 Andréia Suntaque (born 1977), Brazilian goalkeeper

Fictional characters 
 Andréia Bijou, a character from Duas Caras

Portuguese feminine given names